Kuma is a genus of acoels belonging to the family Proporidae.

The species of this genus are found in Europe and America.

Species:
 Kuma albiventer (Marcus, 1954) 
 Kuma asilhas Hooge & Rocha, 2006

References

Acoelomorphs